Sucha Singh Langah is an Indian politician and belongs to the Shiromani Akali Dal. He is a former cabinet Minister in Punjab Government. He was Minister for Public Works Department from 1997 to 2002 and then Minister for Agriculture from 2007 to 2012.

Family and Education
His father's name is  Tara Singh. He has studied up to matriculation. His wife name is Narinder kaur Langah and he has 2 sons and 2 daughters from wife narinder kaur

Political career
He was elected to the Punjab Legislative Assembly in 1997 on an Akali Dal ticket from Dhariwal.  He was made a cabinet Minister for Public Works Department during 1997-2002. In 2007 he was re-elected from Dhariwal In 2007, he was made again a cabinet minister and given portfolio of Agriculture. In 2012, he unsuccessfully contested from newly formed constituency Dera Baba Nanak. His video with a girl went viral on social media and a case was lodged against him. He was later granted bail.

References

Living people
Agriculture Ministers of India
Shiromani Akali Dal politicians
Indian Sikhs
Punjab, India MLAs 1997–2002
Punjab, India MLAs 2007–2012
Public works ministers
Place of birth missing (living people)
1966 births